The first season of the Sgt. Frog anime series consists of the first fifty-one episodes from the series, which first aired in Japan from April 3, 2004, to March 26, 2005, on TV Tokyo. The season features one opening song and three different ending songs.  by Nobuaki Kakuda & Juri Ihata is used as the opening from episode 1 to 51.  by Dance Man is used as the ending from episode 1 to 18 and again from episode 27 to 39.  by Ondo Girls meet Keroro Platoon is used as the ending from episode 19 to 26.  by Keroro Platoon is used as the ending from episode 40 to 51.

Funimation Entertainment licensed this season for distribution in 2008, and released it on DVD from 2009 to 2010 as two separate seasons. The first set, entitled "Season 1 Part 1", was released September 22, 2009, and contains episodes 1 through 13, The second set, "Season 1 Part 2", was released on November 24, 2009, and contains episodes 14 through 26. A third set, "Season 2 Part 1", was released on January 26, 2010, containing episodes 27 through 39. "Season 2 Part 2" was released on March 30, 2010 containing episodes 40 through 51. The first two boxsets were re-released into one set on March 29, 2011, with the complete second season set following up on April 26, 2011. Discotek Media re-released this season in SD Blu-ray on October 26, 2021.

This is currently the only season of Sgt. Frog in which all the episodes have a received an English dub.


Episode list

References

External links
  TV Tokyo Keroro Gunsō website 1st season episodes
  Keroro Gunsō schedule - Sunrise

2004 Japanese television seasons
2005 Japanese television seasons
Season 1